Gwangju Airport (Hangul: 광주공항, Hanja: 光州空港, Revised Romanization of Korean: Gwangju Gonghang, McCune-Reischauer: Kwangju Konghang)  is an airport in the city of Gwangju, South Korea and is managed by the Korea Airports Corporation. In 2018, 1,986,125 passengers used the airport. This airport is planned to close when Muan International Airport becomes more established. Because Gwangju Airport is sharing with military, taking photograph or video of apron, runway and military facility is strictly prohibited.

History 

The airport was established in November 1948. It saw its first commercial flight in 1950. At the time, however, it was not located in Gwangju but in neighboring Jangseong, on a military training facility. The airport moved to its present location in Sinchon-dong, Gwangsan-gu, in 1964. It was taken over by the Korea Airports Corporation in 1990. The current airport terminal was built in 1994, at which time the old terminal was repurposed as a Cargo terminal.

Location 
Situated 11 km west of downtown Gwangju, Gwangju International Airport has two terminals for passenger and cargo, a runway, taxi stops, and parking lot accommodating about 820 vehicles.

Airlines and destinations

Ground transportation

Metro
 Airport station of Gwangju Metro Line 1 :

Line: Pyeongdong - Songjeongri(KTX Station) - Airport - Sangmu - Nongseong - Geumnamro4ga - Nokdong

Bus
 No. Songjeong 97 : Airport ↔ Gwangju Songjeong Station ↔ Daesan ↔ Chilseong ↔ Gwangam
 No. Seonun 101 : Airport ↔ Songjeong Park Station ↔ Gwangsan Police Station ↔ Honam University Gwangsan Campus
 No. 1000 : Airport ↔ Gwangju Songjeong Station ↔ Kim Daejung Convention Center ↔ City Hall ↔ U Square(Gwangju Bus Terminal) ↔ Geumnam-ro ↔ Chosun University ↔ Gwangju Court ↔ Jisan Yuwonji
 No. 1160(Naju) : Airport ↔ Naju ↔ Yeongsanpo Bus Terminal

Parking lot 

Customers should pick up a parking ticket from a printing machine on the way into the lot. If customers do not pick up the ticket, they have to pay the full fare.

See also 
 Transportation in South Korea

References

External links 
 Official Site (in English)

Buildings and structures in Gwangju
Airports in South Korea
Gwangsan District
Korean War air bases
Airports established in 1948
1948 establishments in South Korea
20th-century architecture in South Korea